St. Libory is an unincorporated community and census-designated place (CDP) in southeastern Howard County, Nebraska, United States. As of the 2010 census it had a population of 264.

Although St. Libory is unincorporated, it has a post office, with the ZIP code of 68872. St. Libory is known in the region for its fresh melon market.

Demographics

History
St. Libory got its start when the Union Pacific Railroad was extended to that point. It was named after the village of St. Libory, Illinois. The first post office in St. Libory was established in 1878.

References

Census-designated places in Howard County, Nebraska
Census-designated places in Nebraska